Jairo Aurelio Ampudia Perea (born 14 February 1966) is a Colombian former footballer who played as a defender.

Career
Born in Cali, Ampudia played for América de Cali, Unión Magdalena, Atlético Bucaramanga, Millonarios, Cúcuta Deportivo, Cortuluá, Atlético Junior and Deportivo Cali.

He made two international appearances for Colombia, in 1997.

References

1966 births
Living people
Colombian footballers
Colombia international footballers
América de Cali footballers
Unión Magdalena footballers
Atlético Bucaramanga footballers
Millonarios F.C. players
Cúcuta Deportivo footballers
Cortuluá footballers
Atlético Junior footballers
Deportivo Cali footballers
Association football defenders
Footballers from Cali